Karita Coffey (born 1947) is a Comanche ceramist, noted especially for producing ceramic versions of cultural items from her tribe, in addition to ceramic vessels. She also works in lost-wax cast metals

Background and education 
Karita Coffey's Comanche name is Tsat-Tah Mo-oh Kahn, which translates to "Good-Handed." Coffey lived in Lawton, Oklahoma, before beginning her artistic training at the Institute of American Indian Arts when it was still a high school. She earned her bachelor's of fine arts and graduate degree from the University of Oklahoma.

Career 
Karita later taught at IAIA for 25 years before retiring in 2015 to work on her sculpture.

Coffey's work is informed by aspects of African art and the art of the Australian Aborigines as well as by her own heritage.

Exhibitions 

 Contemporary Native American Art at the Gardiner Art Gallery at Oklahoma State University, 1983
 Women of Sweetgrass, Cedar, and Sage, Gallery of the American Indian Community House, travelling exhibition curated by Harmony Hammond and Jaune Quick-to-See Smith, 1985.
 Anticipating the Dawn: Contemporary Art by Native American Women, at the Gardiner Art Gallery at Oklahoma State University, curated by Anita Fields, 2000.

Public collections 
Her work is represented in the collection of the National Museum of the American Indian, which holds four works by Coffey. The works were created between 1970–71 and were initially purchased by the Indian Arts and Crafts Board, then transferred to the National Museum of the American Indian in 1985. Coffey's work is also in collections of the Fred Jones Jr. Museum of Art, the Millicent Rogers Museum, the Heard Museum, and the IAIA Museum of Contemporary Native Arts.

References

1947 births
Living people
American women ceramists
American ceramists
20th-century ceramists
20th-century American artists
20th-century American women artists
21st-century ceramists
21st-century American artists
21st-century American women artists
Institute of American Indian Arts alumni
University of Oklahoma alumni
Institute of American Indian Arts faculty
People from Lawton, Oklahoma
Sculptors from Oklahoma
Native American women artists
Comanche people
American women academics
National Museum of the American Indian
21st-century Native American women
21st-century Native Americans
20th-century Native American women
20th-century Native Americans
Native American women academics